Philip Howard Francis Dixon Evergood (born Howard Blashki; 1901–1973) was an American painter, etcher, lithographer, sculptor, illustrator and writer.
He was particularly active during the Depression and World War II era.

Life

Philip Evergood was born in New York City. His mother was English and his father, Miles Evergood, was an Australian artist of Polish Jewish descent who, in 1915, changed the family's name from Blashki to Evergood. Philip Evergood's formal education began in 1905. He studied music and by 1908 he was playing the piano in a concert with his teacher.

He attended different English boarding schools starting in 1909 and was educated mainly at Eton and Cambridge University. In 1921 he decided to study art, left Cambridge, and went to London to study with Henry Tonks at the Slade School.

In 1923 Evergood went back to New York where he studied at the Art Students League of New York for a year. He then returned to Europe, worked at various jobs in Paris, painted independently, and studied at the Académie Julian with André Lhote. He also studied with Stanley William Hayter at Atelier 17; Hayter taught him engraving.

He returned to New York in 1926 and began a career that was marked by the hardships of severe illness, an almost fatal operation, and constant financial trouble.

It was not until the collector Joseph H. Hirshhorn purchased several of his paintings that he could consider his financial troubles over. Evergood worked on WPA art projects from 1934 to 1937 where he painted two murals: The Story of Richmond Hill (1936–37, Public Library branch, Queens, N.Y.) and 'Cotton from Field to Mill (1938, post office in Jackson, Ga.).  He taught both music and art as late as 1943, and finally moved to Southbury, Connecticut, in 1952. He was a full member of the Art Students League of New York and the National Institute of Arts and Letters. He was killed in a house fire in Bridgewater, Connecticut, in 1973 at the age of 72. He is buried in Green-Wood Cemetery, Brooklyn.

A New York City police officer was killed in the line of duty at Evergood's house located at 132 Bank Street, Greenwich Village on August 17, 1947. Police Officer Thomas J. Gargan, responding to a neighbor's call reporting a burglary, was fatally shot in the chest and his partner was wounded by the burglar. Gargan was posthumously awarded the Daily News Hero Award. It was the second time he had won this award. The burglar used a single shot signal flare gun (sawed off shotgun) he had found in the house. He was sentenced to death and executed in 1948. Evergood was charged with violating the Sullivan Act for failing to register the gun. He was acquitted by a three judge panel.

Art 
Evergood's influences include El Greco, Bosch, Brueghel, Goya, Daumier, Toulouse-Lautrec, Sloan's Ashcan paintings, and even prehistoric cave art.

Though he experimented with etching and lithography in the 1920s, he did not begin to devote himself on a large scale to original printmaking until after 1945. At this time he studied printmaking techniques at the New York studio of Stanley William Hayter. During the following twenty-five years he produced many works of art in both lithography and etching.

During the 1950s Evergood departed from his established "Social Realism" style and concentrated on symbolism, both biblical and mythological. A characteristic work of this period in Evergood's life is The New Lazarus, painted in 1954 and presently housed in the Whitney Museum of American Art.

Oils at auction 

The following is a sample of Evergood oil paintings that have sold at auction. Significant works in oil by the artist tend to be in the five figure range (USD), while less important works are most often represented by sales in the low, mid and high four figure range (USD). Extremely important works of particular renown by this artist can reasonably be expected to break into the six figure range (USD) and are infrequently seen on the open market due to heavy museum consumption of important Evergood works from the 1950s through the 1980s.

  13–09–06 	Victory Buttons 	  	Oil	US$54,000
  13–07–06 	Self-portrait With Nudes 	Oil	US$1,680
  25–06–06 	Girl in Garden 	  	        Oil	US$2,185
  03–12–05 	Little Rock 	  	        Oil	US$8,000
  24–05–05 	Still Life With Fishermen	Oil	US$8,500
  22–05–05 	Woman And Laughing Dog 	  	Brush	US$2,300
  20–05–05 	Portrait Of Richard Esquire 	Oil	US$1,057
  23–03–05 	Forest With Riders 	  	Oil	US$6,600
  27–09–04 	Fruit 	  	76.8 x 59.1 in	Oil	US$28,680
  08–09–04 	Fat of the Land 	  	Oil	US$8,963
  18–05–04 	The Dog Bite Clinic 	  	Oil	US$71,700
  07–03–04 	Children And Very Giant Squash 	Oil	US$7,000
  07–10–03 	World War I 	  	        Oil	Unsold

Selected exhibitions 

 Corcoran Gallery of Art, 1928, 1939–1963
 Salons of America, 1934
 PAFA, 1934–66 (gold medal 1949, 1958)
 AIC 1935 (prize)
 AIC 1946 (prize)
 WFNY, 1939
 La Pintura Contemporanea Norte America, 1941
 WMA, 1942
 AV 1942 (prize)
 American-British Goodwill Art Exhibition, 1944
 Pepsi Cola Art Competition, 1944 (winner)
 Tate Gallery: London 1946
 American Art Exhibition: Moscow, 1959
 Whitney Museum of American Art 1934–66 (Evergood Retrospective – 1967)
 Gallery Of Modern Art, Hunington, Hartford Museum, 1967
 ASL New York, 1967–68
 Smithsonian, 1968
 The WPA Art Of New York City Exhibit, Parsons School Of Design, 1977 (posthumous)

Museum collections
This is a partial list of works by Evergood in museums.

 Vatican Museum (Strange Bird Contemplating the Doom of Man)
 Smithsonian (numerous)
 Tate Gallery, London (numerous)
 Boston Museum of Fine Arts (numerous)
 Dallas Museum of Art (Portrait of My Mother, 1927–1946)
 Los Angeles County Museum of Art (numerous)
 Art Institute of Chicago (numerous)
 Metropolitan Museum of Art (numerous)
 Museum of Modern Art, New York (numerous)
 Georgia Museum of Art (My Forebears Were Pioneers, 1939)
 Hunter Museum of American Art (Love on the Beach, 1937)
 Brooklyn Museum of Art (numerous)
 Hirshhorn Museum and Sculpture Garden
 Montclair Art Museum (Fascist Company, 1942)
 Orange County Museum of Art (Madonna of the Mines, 1932)
 Smart Museum of Art at the University of Chicago
 Terra Foundation for American Art (Passing Show, 1951)
 Tweed Museum of Art at the University of Minnesota, Duluth (Pittsburgh Family, 1944)
 University of Kentucky Art Museum (Self-Portrait, 1960)
 Whitney Museum of American Art (Lily and the Sparrows, 1939, The New Lazarus 1954)
 Jule Collins Smith Museum of Fine Art at Auburn University (Fascist Leader, 1946)
 Baltimore Museum of Art (No Sale, 1945, Flight of Fancy, 1947)
 Chrysler Museum of Art, Norfolk, VA (Music, 1933–1959)
 Worcester Art Museum, Worcester, MA (The Rubber Raft, 1945)
 Columbus Museum of Art, Columbus, OH (Spring, 1934)
 Reynolda House Museum of American Art, Winston-Salem, NC (Ancient Queen, 1960)

External links 

The Good, the Bad and Philip Evergood
Smithsonian Online Page Representing The Evergood Papers Collection
Columbus Museum of Art Web page on Evergood's 1934 oil painting Spring (click on picture for larger image)
Kendall Taylor collection relating to Philip Evergood at Syracuse University
Collection of Paintings by Philip Evergood, at Terminartors.com
Blanton Museum of Art, Austin Texas- Dance Marathon, 1934
Taylor, Kendall.  Philip Evergood: Never Separate from the Heart.  Cranbury, NJ: Associated University Presses, 1987.

References 

1901 births
1973 deaths
20th-century American painters
American male painters
American people of Polish-Jewish descent
American people of English descent
Art Students League of New York alumni
Deaths from fire in the United States
Accidental deaths in Connecticut
People educated at Eton College
Alumni of the University of Cambridge
Alumni of the Slade School of Fine Art
Académie Julian alumni
Burials at Green-Wood Cemetery
Painters from New York City
Federal Art Project artists
20th-century American printmakers
People from Bridgewater, Connecticut
Social realist artists
Atelier 17 alumni
20th-century American male artists
Members of the American Academy of Arts and Letters